The Music are a British alternative rock band.

The Music may also refer to:

 The Music (album), their eponymous 2003 album
 The Music (film), a 1972 Japanese film by Yasuzo Masumura
 The Music (magazine), an Australian entertainment magazine
 The Music (sculpture), a 1952 sculpture by Józef Gosławski
 The Music, a 1999 album by Radioinactive
 "The Music", a song by David Usher from his 2007 album Strange Birds

See also 
 Music (disambiguation)